Ruuskanen is a Finnish surname. Notable people with the surname include:

 Kustaa Ruuskanen (1881–1971), Finnish farmer and politician
 Antti Ruuskanen (born 1984), Finnish track and field athlete
 Juha-Matti Ruuskanen (born 1984), Finnish ski jumper

Finnish-language surnames